Fern allies are a diverse group of seedless vascular plants that are not true ferns.  Like ferns, a fern ally disperses by shedding spores to initiate an alternation of generations.

Classification

Originally, three or four groups of plants were considered to be fern allies.  In various classification schemes, these may be grouped as classes or divisions within the plant kingdom.  Fern allies and ferns were sometimes grouped together as division Pteridophyta. Another traditional classification scheme of living plants is as follows (here, the first three classes are the "fern allies"):

Kingdom: Plantae
Division Tracheophyta (vascular plants)
Class Lycopodiopsida, clubmosses and related plants (fern-allies) 
Class Sphenopsida or Equisetopsida, horsetails and scouring-rushes (fern-allies)
Class Psilotopsida, whisk ferns (fern-allies)
Class Filices or Pteropsida, true ferns (including leptosporangiates, marattioids, adder's-tongues, and moonworts)
Class Spermatopsida (or sometimes as several different classes of seed-bearing plants)

More recent evidence shows that the class Filices, as described above, is not monophyletic. The following classification represents a consensus view (although different authors may use different names for the various groups):

Kingdom Plantae
Division Tracheophyta
Class Lycopodiopsida 
Order Lycopodiales, clubmosses
Order Selaginellales, spikemosses
Order Isoetales, quillworts and scale trees
Class Polypodiopsida, true ferns
Subclass Equisetidae, horsetails and scouring-rushes
Subclass Ophioglossidae, whisk ferns, adders'-tongues and moonworts (also called Psilotopsida)
Subclass Marattiidae, marattioid ferns
Subclass Polypodiidae, leptosporangiate ferns (also called Pteridopsida, or Filicopsida)
Class Spermatophyta (or as several different divisions of seed-bearing plants)

Note that in either scheme, the same basic groups are recognized (Lycopodiophyta, Equisetopsida, Psilotopsida, and true ferns), but in the most recent scheme, both Equisetopsida and Psilotopsida are grouped as a subset of the true ferns, and only the Lycopodiophyta are not classified as ferns.

Relationships
Historically, several groups of plants were considered "fern allies": the clubmosses, spikemosses, and quillworts in the Lycopodiophyta, the whisk ferns in Psilotaceae, and the horsetails in the Equisetaceae. Similarly, three discrete groups of plants had been considered ferns: the adders-tongues, moonworts, and grape-ferns (Ophioglossales), the Marattiaceae, and the leptosporangiate ferns. More recent genetic studies have shown that the Lycopodiophyta are only distantly related to any other vascular plants, having radiated evolutionarily at the base of the vascular plant clade, while both the whisk ferns and horsetails are as much true ferns as are the Ophioglossoids and Marattiaceae.  The Marattiaceae are a group of tropical ferns with a large, fleshy rhizome, and are now thought to be a sister group to the main group of ferns, the leptosporangiate ferns. The whisk ferns and Ophioglossids are demonstrably a clade, as are the leptosporangiate ferns and marattiaceae; however, the relationships between these two groups and the horsetails within the overarching clade of ferns remains uncertain.

References

External links
Common Ferns and Fern-Ally Species 
A Classification of the Ferns and Fern-Allies (uses frames)
Non-seed plant images at bioimages.vanderbilt.edu
Lord, Thomas R. (2006). Ferns and Fern Allies of Pennsylvania. Indiana, PA: Pinelands Press 

Cryptogams